Salford is a village and former civil parish, now in the parish of Hulcote and Salford, in the Central Bedfordshire district, in the ceremonial county of Bedfordshire, England. It is located near the large new town of Milton Keynes and the M1 motorway. In 1931 the parish had a population of 133. On 1 April 1933, the parish was merged with Hulcote to form "Hulcote and Salford".

The Church of St Mary the Virgin is in the village.

References

External links

Villages in Bedfordshire
Former civil parishes in Bedfordshire
Central Bedfordshire District